Nagatino-Sadovniki District  is an administrative district (raion) of Southern Administrative Okrug, and one of the 125 raions of Moscow, Russia.

See also
Administrative divisions of Moscow
Sadovniki (park)

References

Notes

External links

 Website of district
 Nagatino-Sadovniki, 1, 29A Official website

Districts of Moscow